Ibiza is an administrative neighborhood of Madrid belonging to the district of Retiro. As of 1 February 2020, it has a population of 22,050. The building complex of the Hospital General Universitario Gregorio Marañón is located in the neighborhood.

References 

Wards of Madrid
Retiro (Madrid)